The 2016–17 Vancouver Canucks season was the 47th season for the National Hockey League franchise that was established on May 22, 1970. For the third consecutive season, they opened the season with a match against the Calgary Flames. The team finished with the lowest-scoring season in franchise history, scoring just 182 goals. The day after the Canucks' season-ending game, head coach Willie Desjardins was fired, along with assistant coaches Doug Lidster and Perry Pearn. The Canucks overall missed the playoffs for the second consecutive year.

Off-season
The Canucks made their first off-season move while the 2016 Stanley Cup playoffs were still in action, sending centre Jared McCann and second and fourth round picks to the Florida Panthers in exchange for defenceman Erik Gudbranson and a fifth-round pick. On June 27, two days after the 2016 NHL Entry Draft, the Canucks placed winger Chris Higgins on unconditional waivers and subsequently bought out the final year of his contract.

Training camp
Vancouver's 2016 training camp was held in Whistler, British Columbia, on September 22–26, 2016.

Regular season

During the team bye week in February, many Canucks players experienced mumps symptoms, with some being diagnosed with the disease. Compounded with ongoing injuries to other players at the time, the Canucks played their following game with 11 regulars out of the lineup, where they lost to the San Jose Sharks 4–1.

Preceding the 2017 NHL trade deadline, the Canucks traded long-time forward Alex Burrows to the Ottawa Senators in exchange for prospect Jonathan Dahlen on February 27, 2017. The following night, they traded another long-time forward, Jannik Hansen, to the San Jose Sharks in exchange for Nikolay Goldobin and a conditional fourth-round pick at the 2017 NHL Entry Draft.

The Canucks finished their season with 69 points and had the second-best odds for the draft lottery of the 2017 NHL Entry Draft.

Standings

Schedule and results

Pre-season

Regular season

Detailed records

Player statistics
Final stats

Skaters

Goaltenders

†Acquired by Canucks mid-season. Stats reflect time with Canucks only.
‡Acquired by another team mid-season. Stats reflect time with Canucks only.

Awards and honours

Awards

Milestones

Transactions
The Canucks been involved in the following transactions:

Trades

Free agents acquired

Free agents lost

Claimed via waivers

Lost via waivers

Player signings

Draft picks

Below are the Vancouver Canucks' selections at the 2016 NHL Entry Draft, to be held on June 24–25, 2016, at the First Niagara Center in Buffalo, New York.

Draft notes
 The Vancouver Canucks' second-round pick went to the Buffalo Sabres as the result of a trade on June 25, 2016, that sent Mark Pysyk, a second-round pick and St. Louis' third-round pick both in 2016 (38th and 89th overall) to Florida in exchange for Dmitri Kulikov and this pick. Florida previously acquired this pick as the result of a trade on May 25, 2016, that sent Erik Gudbranson and the Islanders' fifth-round pick in 2016 to Vancouver in exchange for Jared McCann, a fourth-round pick in 2016 and this pick.
 The Vancouver Canucks' fourth-round pick went to the Florida Panthers as the result of a trade on May 25, 2016, that sent Erik Gudbranson and the Islanders' fifth-round pick in 2016 to Vancouver in exchange for Jared McCann, a second-round pick in 2016 and this pick.
 The Vancouver Canucks' fifth-round pick went to the Montreal Canadiens as the result of a trade on July 1, 2015, that sent Brandon Prust to Vancouver in exchange for Zack Kassian and this pick.
  The New York Islanders' fifth-round pick went to the Vancouver Canucks as the result of a trade on May 25, 2016, that sent Jared McCann, a second and fourth-round pick both in 2016 to Florida in exchange for Erik Gudbranson and this pick. Florida previously acquired this pick as the result of a trade on June 27, 2015, that sent Montreal's fifth-round pick in 2015 to New York in exchange for this pick.
  The Carolina Hurricanes' seventh-round pick went to the Vancouver Canucks as the result of a trade on June 27, 2015, that sent Eddie Lack to Carolina in exchange for a third-round pick in 2015 and this pick.

References

Vancouver Canucks seasons
Vancouver Canucks season, 2016-17
Vancou